Eucalyptus pachyphylla, commonly known as thick-leaved mallee or the red-budded mallee, is a species of mallee that is native to inland Australia. It has smooth bark, egg-shaped to lance-shaped adult leaves, flower buds in groups of three with five prominent ribs on each bud, and broad, shallow, conical to hemispherical fruit.

Description
It has a smooth textured white, grey, grey brown, grey-pink or brown bark that is sheds in loose ribbons at the base.

The buds are pinkish near flowering time. Flowering occurs between April and July and the flowers are creamy yellow.

Taxonomy
Eucalyptus pachyphylla was first formally described in 1859 by Ferdinand von Mueller in the Journal of the Proceedings of the Linnean Society, Botany. The specific epithet (pachyphylla) is from ancient Greek meaning "thick-leaved". The name of his species is often misapplied to Eucalyptus alatissima.

Distribution and habitat
Thick-leaved mallee is often found on sand dunes and sand plains as well as rocky slopes and grows in red sandy soils. In Western Australia it is found throughout much of the Pilbara and Goldfields-Esperance regions. It is also found in the Northern Territory, South Australia and Queensland.

Use in horticulture
It is sold commercially and can be used as an ornamental plant, informal screen or windbreak and will attract birds. It is best grown in a position in full sun. It can tolerate drought and moderate frosts.

See also
List of Eucalyptus species

References

Eucalypts of Western Australia
Flora of South Australia
Flora of Queensland
Flora of the Northern Territory
pachyphylla
Myrtales of Australia
Plants described in 1859
Taxa named by Ferdinand von Mueller